Savogna ( (locally )) is a comune (municipality) in the Province of Udine in the Italian region Friuli-Venezia Giulia, located about  northwest of Trieste and about  northeast of Udine, on the border with Slovenia.

Savogna localities include: Barza/Barca, Blasin/Blažin, Brizza di Sopra/Gorenje Barca, Brizza di Sotto/Dolenje Barca, Cepletischis/Čeplešišče, Crisnaro/Kranjac, Dus/Duš, Fletta/Fleta, Franz/Franci, Gabrovizza/Gabruca, Iellina/Jelina, Ieronizza/Jeronišče, Losaz/Ložac, Masseris/Mašera, Montemaggiore/Matajur, Pechinie di Sopra/Gorenje Pečnije, Pechinie di Sotto/Dolenje Pečnije, Podar, Podoreg/Podorieh, Polava, Savogna/Sauodnja, Stefenig/Stiefinči, Stermizza/Starmica, Tercimonte/Tarčmun.

According to the census 1971 77.2% of the population are Slovenes.

Savogna borders the following municipalities: Kobarid (Slovenia), Grimacco, Pulfero, San Leonardo, San Pietro al Natisone.

Demographic evolution

References

See also
Venetian Slovenia
Friuli
Slovene Lands

Cities and towns in Friuli-Venezia Giulia